Convent Road is located to the north of Letterkenny, County Donegal, in the parish of Conwal and Leck, Ireland.

It is situated beside the Cathedral of St Eunan and St Columba.

Cathedral Road forms a link with Convent Road south of Glencar and north of Oldtown.

Residential areas
Residential areas on Convent Road include West Hill, the entrance of which is located at the top and descends, as the name suggests, in a westerly direction.

Amenities
Many schools are nearby, including St Eunan's College. Kernan's is the local newsagent and also provider of other services. The Kernan family have been in business since the 1920s.

Dunnes Stores provides groceries and other services.

The Chan family runs the Tin Tai, which is regarded as one of the county's most popular takeaways. Specialising in Chinese food, the Tin Tai is located at the bottom of Convent Road, on the turn towards Lower Main Street.

Letterkenny Regional Sports and Leisure Complex is a short distance away.

Convent
A convent was founded here in 1854. It houses a Roman Catholic girls secondary school, one of 18 Loreto secondary schools in Ireland and one of the few schools in Ireland that stills employs  nuns to teach the girls who go there. The Convent secondary school is linked with the primary school for girls, Scoil Mhuire Gan Smal, as they are both part of the greater Loreto College Network. Many of the girls' brothers attend or will have attended St Eunan's College, which is a short distance up the road. In addition, the primary school for boys, Scoil Colmcille, is located across the road.

Mary Ward founded The Institute of the Blessed Virgin Mary (better known in Ireland as the "Loreto Order") in England in the 17th century. Mother Frances Teresa Ball brought the Order to Ireland in 1821. In 1854, the then Bishop of Raphoe, Dr McGettigan, invited the religious sisters to set up a secondary school for girls in Letterkenny. The day-school opened with 5 pupils on 4 September 1854. From the 1920s until 1976 it was an all-Irish school. A new wing with a concert hall opened in 1939. Boarding ceased in 1978.  Extensions were added in 1972, 1978 and 1986, while an extension (sanctioned by the Department of Education) opened to coincide with the school's 150th anniversary in mid-2004. The first classes began here in September 2005. Noel Ferry became the school's first lay and male headmaster since its opening.

Order is kept by a principal and a board of management. Loreto Trustees are designated legal owners but devolve much of its power to the board. The Loreto Order, parents and teachers elect delegates for a three-year period. A parents' association involves itself in fundraising, sport, study supervision and the environment, with new members invited to join annually and ratified at an AGM. A student council represents girls at the school and liaises with other students, staff, board and parents' association. A Student Leadership Team is led by the Head and Deputy Head Girl, elected annually from the 6th year group. The school participates in the European Youth Parliament, and hosts the Loreto Letterkenny Model United Nations (LKMUN).

Joe McHugh, the Fine Gael TD for Donegal and Minister for Education and Skills from 2018, taught the girls here before becoming the school's most recognised face nationally. His constituency office is located near the foot of Convent Road. The sisters Caitriona Jennings, a runner; and Sinéad Lynch; née Jennings, a rower, as well as Ciara Grant, a footballer.

References

Geography of Letterkenny